Brian Taylor  is an American filmmaker. He is best known for collaborating with Mark Neveldine in the writing/directing team Neveldine/Taylor.

Career

Taylor attended the Los Angeles Film School in Hollywood and began his career as a cinematographer, working on independent films and low-budget shorts.  In the early 2000s, Taylor united with Mark Neveldine to form the directing team Neveldine/Taylor.  Known for their aggressive, high energy camerawork, the team signed with @radical.media in 2004 as commercial directors.  They shot campaigns for Nike, Powerade, Budweiser and many others before moving to the big screen in 2006 with their first feature, Crank.

According to Taylor, the high adrenaline Crank was written as "an attack on studio filmmaking." The film spawned a sequel, Crank: High Voltage (2009) that Quentin Tarantino called “The Gremlins 2 of action movies.” The team pioneered the RED ONE camera on the dystopian science fiction mashup Gamer (2009), then trekked across Europe with Nicolas Cage on Ghost Rider: Spirit of Vengeance (2011).

In February 2012, Taylor signed a seven-figure deal with Sony Pictures to write and direct a film adaptation of the Twisted Metal video game series.  The film has not yet been produced.

In 2016, Taylor teamed up with Grant Morrison to adapt the graphic novel Happy! for Original Films. The series premiered on SyFy in 2017.  Brian and Grant went on to adapt Aldous Huxley's masterpiece Brave New World with Amblin/UCP as a USA series in 2018. 

In 2017, Taylor wrote and directed the horror comedy film Mom and Dad  starring Nicolas Cage, Selma Blair and Anne Winters. The film premiered at Toronto International Film Festival 2017 as part of the Midnight Madness lineup and was released in theaters on January 19, 2018. In February 2023, Taylor was announced as the director of the live-action reboot Hellboy: The Crooked Man.

Filmography
With Mark Neveldine

Solo works

References

External links

 Brian Taylor at FEARnet
 

American film directors
American film producers
American male screenwriters
Living people
Place of birth missing (living people)
Year of birth missing (living people)